Chen Jin (born 10 January 1986) is a retired badminton player from China. He is a former world men's singles champion and an Olympic bronze medalist. He also served as women's singles coach of the China national badminton team.

Career

2004–2008 
Since winning the Asian Junior Championships in 2004, Chen developed into one of the world's elite men's singles players. His titles include the 2004 Polish International, 2004 French International, 2006 German Open, 2007 Swiss Open, and 2007 Macau Open. Chen also captured the China Masters title in 2006, and in 2008 he won his biggest title to date, the prestigious All England Open Badminton Championships over his teammate and then-world number one, Lin Dan. At the 2008 Beijing Olympics, however, he was beaten by Lin in the semi-final and settled for a bronze medal after defeating South Korea's Lee Hyun-il in the playoff for third place. Chen was also a bronze medalist at the 2007 BWF World Championships and a silver medalist at the 2008 Badminton Asia Championships. He is also a member of China's Thomas Cup-winning world men's team champion, lifting the highly coveted cup in 2006 and 2008.

2009 
Chen skipped the Malaysia Open and Korea Open events in January. His first tournament in 2009 was the All England Open. Chen went down 12–21 6–11 (retired) against Lin Dan in the semi-final having suffered a slight leg injury. A week later, Chen participated in the Swiss Open. He was again blown away by Lin, losing 13–21 14–21 in their semi-final match. In May, Chen reached the semi-final of the Singapore Open before being defeated by another teammate, Bao Chunlai, with a scoreline of 19–21 18–21.

In June, Chen participated in the Indonesia Open. In Indonesia, he defeated the reigning Olympic champion, Lin Dan, 18–21 21–17 21–4 in the quarter-finals. However, Chen could not progress pass the semi-final stage after being defeated by Lee Chong Wei with a scoreline of 15–21 20–22. In August, Chen won a silver medal at the 2009 BWF World Championships. Chen once again fell to his compatriot, Lin Dan, 21–18, 21–16 in 45 minutes in the final in Hyderabad, India.

2010 
In January, Chen entered the Malaysia Open and reached the quarter-finals before losing out to Lee Chong Wei in straight games 11–21, 13–21. A week later, Chen went to the Korea Open. He again reached the quarter-finals before again tasting defeat at the hands of the top seed Lee Chong Wei, this time in rubber games, 14–21, 21–15, 16–21. In March, Chen took part in the All England Open. In yet another quarter-final showing, he lost to Kenichi Tago in rubber games. In the following week, Chen managed to capture his second Swiss Open. The finalist he beat was his compatriot Chen Long. Chen won in rubber games 12–21, 21–15, 21–17 in the final. Later in May, Chen was selected to represent his country in the 2010 Thomas & Uber Cup which was held in Kuala Lumpur, Malaysia and subsequently won the championships after beating Indonesia 3–0 in the Thomas Cup final. Chen played the second singles in the championships. In the final match, he beat Indonesia's Simon Santoso in rubber games 19–21, 21–17, 21–7.

Chen began the second half of the year in style by winning the 2010 BWF World Championships, becoming world champion. He beat Indonesia's Taufik Hidayat 21–13, 21–15 in the final. In September, Chen participated in the China Masters but was outplayed by Chou Tien-chen from Chinese Taipei 18–21, 8–16 (retired) in the second round due to a leg injury. After a two-month rest, Chen came back to play in the 2010 Asian Games men's team and individual tournament which were held in Guangzhou, China. Chen again helped Chinese men's team reach the final by defeating Hong Kong's Chan Yan Kit in the quarter-finals, Indonesia's Simon Santoso in the semi-final, and in the final, he beat South Korean Son Wan-ho with an easy 21–9, 21–15 win. Chen also helped secure the men's team gold medal for China. Later in the individual tournament, Chen again lost to the world number one Lee Chong Wei in rubber games 21–14, 15–21, 7–21. In the final game, Chen made a lot of careless mistakes and allowed Lee to pull away at 11–4, 16–6 and 20–7. Hence, Chen could only add a bronze medal for China in the individual event. A week later, Chen took part in the China Open which was held in Shanghai and reached the semi-finals.

2011 
Chen kicked-off the second half of the year with a bronze medal at the 2011 BWF World Championships. He was unable to defend his title after being thrashed by Lee Chong Wei 13–21, 9–21 in the semi-finals.

2012

2013

Coaching 
After his retirement from competitive badminton, in 2014, he was roped into the national set-up to revamp the women's singles squad.

Achievements

Olympic Games 
Men's singles

BWF World Championships 
Men's singles

World Cup 
Men's singles

Asian Games 
Men's singles

Asian Championships 
Men's singles

World Junior Championships 
Boys' singles

Asian Junior Championships 
Boys' singles

BWF Superseries 
The BWF Superseries, launched on 14 December 2006 and implemented in 2007, is a series of elite badminton tournaments, sanctioned by Badminton World Federation (BWF). BWF Superseries has two levels: Superseries and Superseries Premier. A season of Superseries features twelve tournaments around the world, which introduced since 2011, with successful players invited to the Superseries Finals held at the year end.

Men's singles

  BWF Superseries Finals tournament
  BWF Superseries Premier tournament
  BWF Superseries tournament

BWF Grand Prix 
The BWF Grand Prix has two level such as Grand Prix and Grand Prix Gold. It is a series of badminton tournaments, sanctioned by Badminton World Federation (BWF) since 2007. The World Badminton Grand Prix has been sanctioned by the International Badminton Federation since 1983.

Men's singles

  BWF Grand Prix Gold tournament
  BWF & IBF Grand Prix tournament

IBF International 
Men's singles

References

External links 
 
 
 

1986 births
Living people
Sportspeople from Handan
Badminton players from Hebei
Chinese male badminton players
Badminton players at the 2008 Summer Olympics
Badminton players at the 2012 Summer Olympics
Olympic badminton players of China
Olympic bronze medalists for China
Olympic medalists in badminton
Medalists at the 2008 Summer Olympics
Badminton players at the 2006 Asian Games
Badminton players at the 2010 Asian Games
Asian Games gold medalists for China
Asian Games bronze medalists for China
Asian Games medalists in badminton
Medalists at the 2006 Asian Games
Medalists at the 2010 Asian Games
Chinese badminton coaches
21st-century Chinese people